Woodrow Michael Kroll (born October 21, 1944) is an evangelical preacher and radio host. He was the president and Bible teacher for the international Back to the Bible radio and television ministry. He was president of Davis College (formerly Practical Bible College) in Johnson City, New York, United States.

In addition to preaching and teaching, Kroll is a prolific writer, having authored more than 50 books expounding on the Bible and Christian living.

Background and education
Kroll was born to Frank and Betty Kroll in Ellwood City, Pennsylvania. His father, Reverend Frank Kroll, attended Practical Bible Training School (as it was then called) from 1936 to 1939 and pastored the Park Gate Baptist Church in Ellwood City for  years. Kroll followed in his father's footsteps and attended Practical Bible Training School from 1962 to 1965.

Kroll earned a Bachelor of Arts degree in 1967 from Barrington College. He then studied at Gordon-Conwell Theological Seminary, earning a Master of Divinity degree in 1970.  He earned the Master of Theology and Doctor of Theology degrees from Geneva-St. Albans Theological Seminary.  Kroll did post-graduate studies at Harvard Divinity School, Princeton Theological Seminary, the University of Virginia, and the University of Strasbourg (France).

He is married to the former Linda Piper. Their son Timothy has followed his father and grandfather in ministry and is the senior pastor at Northside Baptist Church in St. Petersburg, Florida since 2005.

Ministry and teaching career
Kroll began his ministry as the pastor of First Baptist Church in Middleboro, Massachusetts (1968–1970). He then taught at Practical Bible Training School (now Davis College) 1971–1973. From 1975 to 1980, he chaired the Division of Religion at Liberty University in Lynchburg, Virginia. On January 17, 1981, Kroll was inaugurated as president of Practical Bible Training School, also teaching Bible and preaching while serving as president.

During Kroll's presidency, the school obtained accreditation from the Transnational Association of Christian Colleges and Schools (TRACS) and the American Association of Bible Colleges (AABC, now the Association for Biblical Higher Education). He also developed the administration, curriculum, and much of the school's structure as it exists today, now as Davis College. Kroll resigned on April 27, 1990, to become President and Senior Bible Teacher of the Back to the Bible international radio ministry.

Back to the Bible
Begun in 1939 by Theodore Epp on radio station KFOR (AM) in Lincoln, Nebraska, the Back to the Bible broadcast became a worldwide ministry by the time its founder retired in 1981. Epp was succeeded by Warren W. Wiersbe, former pastor of Moody Church in Chicago, Illinois, who served as leader of the Lincoln, Nebraska-based ministry between 1981–1989. Dr. Kroll was inaugurated in 1990 as the third president of Back to the Bible, the position he held until 2013. During his 23 years of service to Back to the Bible the ministry outreach grew.  At the time of his retirement, Woodrow Kroll was heard daily on 1250 radio stations in the United States and anywhere in the world the English language was spoken.

The HELIOS Projects
Upon retirement from radio, Woodrow Kroll founded a ministry that gave an outlet for his 50 years of teaching and ministry experience.  WKMinistries launched The HELIOS Projects in 2014.  Each project was written and recorded personally by Dr. Kroll.  The first project is HELIOS CT "'Talking Thru the Christian Faith'".  In 199 sessions, each 20-22 minutes long, Kroll uses a conversational style as if he were sitting across an imaginary table to guide the listener into knowing what Christians believe and why they believe it.  In HELIOS GS "Telling God's Story" he retells 372 stories from the Bible, drawing out spiritual insights and practical lessons from each.  HELIOS FF "Foundations of the Faith" is a more remedial approach to understanding what Christians believe for those who may not yet be literate.  Using either a USB, an app, print, or a solar-powered handheld device, The HELIOS Projects are designed to put A Bible and Christian faith education right in your hand.

Books authored by Kroll
Among the more than 50 books Kroll has written on the Bible and Christian living are:

 
 
 
 
 
 
 
 
 
 
 
  (Formerly: Is There a Man in the House?)
 
 
 
 
 
 
 
 
 
 
 
 
 
 
 
 
 
 
 
 
  (Formerly: It Will Be Worth It All)

References

External links
Back to the Bible Online

Living people
American radio personalities
1944 births
Writers from Lincoln, Nebraska
People from Ellwood City, Pennsylvania
American evangelicals
Baptist ministers from the United States
Barrington College alumni
Princeton Theological Seminary alumni
Harvard Divinity School alumni
University of Strasbourg alumni
University of Virginia alumni
People from Johnson City, New York
Baptists from New York (state)